Desmond James Booth (20 July 1920 – 11 December 1996), Australian politician, and dairy farmer and director of a number of agricultural co-operatives and associations prior to election. He was a councillor of the Shire of Glengallan in the Southern Downs region of Queensland, and served with the Australian Imperial Force in New Guinea and the Solomon Islands from 1941 to 1944.

He was elected to the Legislative Assembly of Queensland for Warwick in 1977, representing the National Party, and remained its representative until 1992.

References
 Waterson, D.B. Biographical register of the Queensland Parliament, 1930-1980 Canberra: ANU Press (1982)

1920 births
1996 deaths
National Party of Australia members of the Parliament of Queensland
Members of the Queensland Legislative Assembly
20th-century Australian politicians
Australian Army personnel of World War II